Mario Jardel (born 7 November 2000) is an Indonesian professional footballer who plays as a defender for Liga 1 club Persita Tangerang.

Club career

Persib Bandung
He was signed for Persib Bandung to play in Liga 1 in the 2018 season. Mario made his first-team debut on 16 October 2021 in a match against Bhayangkara as a substitute for Henhen Herdiana in the 90+3rd minute at the Moch. Soebroto Stadium, Magelang.

Persita Tengerang
Jardel was signed for Persita Tangerang to play in Liga 1 in the 2022–23 season. He made his league debut on 28 August 2022 in a match against Bhayangkara at the Wibawa Mukti Stadium, Cikarang.

Career statistics

Club

Notes

References

External links
 Mario Jardel at Soccerway
 Mario Jardel at Liga Indonesia

2000 births
Living people
Indonesian footballers
Liga 1 (Indonesia) players
Persib Bandung players
Persita Tangerang players
Association football defenders
People from Bogor
Sportspeople from West Java